"Summer in Siam" is a single by The Pogues from their 1990 album, Hell's Ditch. Composed by enigmatic frontman Shane MacGowan, it charted in the UK Top 100 at Number 64. The accompanying music video was directed by Don Letts and produced by Nick Verden for Radar Films. The album was produced by Joe Strummer.

References                 

1990 songs
The Pogues songs
Songs written by Shane MacGowan
Folk rock songs
Songs about Thailand